Harsh Thaker (born 24 October 1997) is a Canadian cricketer. He made his List A debut for Canada in the 2018–19 Regional Super50 tournament on 3 October 2018. Prior to his List A debut, he was named in Canada's squad for the 2016 Under-19 Cricket World Cup. In June 2019, he was selected to play for the Vancouver Knights franchise team in the 2019 Global T20 Canada tournament.

In August 2019, he was named in Canada's squad for the Regional Finals of the 2018–19 ICC T20 World Cup Americas Qualifier tournament. He made his Twenty20 International (T20I) debut for Canada against the United States on 25 August 2019. In September 2019, he was named in Canada's squad for the 2019 Malaysia Cricket World Cup Challenge League A tournament. The following month, he was named in Canada's squad for the 2019–20 Regional Super50 tournament in the West Indies.

In October 2021, he was named in Canada's squad for the 2021 ICC Men's T20 World Cup Americas Qualifier tournament in Antigua. In February 2022, he was named in Canada's squad for the 2022 ICC Men's T20 World Cup Global Qualifier A tournament in Oman.

References

External links
 

1997 births
Living people
Canadian cricketers
Canada Twenty20 International cricketers
Place of birth missing (living people)